Treaty of Canterbury can refer to:
Treaty of Canterbury (1416), a diplomatic agreement between Sigismund, Holy Roman Emperor, and Henry V of England for an alliance against France. 
Treaty of Canterbury (1986),  the original document providing for the Channel Tunnel between the United Kingdom and France.